Sir Edward Bashe (died 12 May 1653) was an English politician who sat in the House of Commons  between 1628 and 1640.

Life 

Bashe was the son of Ralph Bashe, of Stanstead Abbots, Hertfordshire and his wife Frances Carey, daughter of Sir Edward Carey, Master of the Jewel Office. He matriculated at Peterhouse, Cambridge in Autumn 1608.  He received a knighthood at Theobalds on 6 June 1616.

In 1625 he obtained the post of Chamberlain of the Exchequer for life.

Bashe was elected Member of Parliament for Stamford in 1628 and sat until 1629 when King Charles decided to rule without parliament for eleven years. In April 1640, he was elected MP for Grantham  in the Short Parliament. 
 
Bashe lived at Stanstead Abbots which had previously belonged to Anne Boleyn and which was granted to Bashe's grandfather Edward Baeshe in 1559. Bashe married Mary Montagu, daughter of Sir Charles Montagu.

Death 

Bashe died in 1653 and was buried at Stanstead Cussans, Hertfordshire. By deed of 10 November 1635 and under his will he founded charities to support almshouses and a school at Stanstead. He had no children and his property went to a cousin Ralph Bashe. At the Restoration in 1660, Ralph unsuccessfully petitioned King Charles II to inherit the office of Chamberlain.

References

 

Year of birth missing
1653 deaths
Alumni of Peterhouse, Cambridge
English MPs 1628–1629
English MPs 1640 (April)